Arthur Thomas Doodson (31 March 1890 – 10 January 1968) was a British oceanographer.

Early life and education
Arthur Thomas Doodson was born in 1890 at Boothstown, Salford, the son of cotton-mill manager Thomas Doodson and Eleanor Pendlebury of Radcliffe, Lancashire. He was educated at Rochdale secondary school and in 1908 entered the University of Liverpool, graduating in both chemistry (1911) and mathematics (1912). He was profoundly deaf and found it difficult to get a job but started with Ferranti in Manchester as a meter tester.

In 1914, he obtained his M.Sc. degree of Liverpool University and in 1916 he was appointed to a post in statistics at University College, London, under Karl Pearson but soon had to work on the calculation of shell trajectories.  He obtained the D.Sc. in 1919.

Career
In 1919, he moved back to Liverpool to work on tidal analysis.
In 1921, Doodson published a major work on tidal analysis. This was the first development of the tide generating potential to be carried out in harmonic form: Doodson distinguished 388 tidal frequencies.  Doodson's analysis of 1921 was based on the then-latest lunar theory of E W Brown. Doodson devised a practical system for specifying the different harmonic components of the tide-generating potential,the Doodson Numbers.

In 1929, he became the Associate Director of Liverpool Observatory and Tidal Institute under the direction of Joseph Proudman. He then spent much of his life developing the analysis of tidal motions mainly in the oceans, but also in lakes, and was the first to devise methods for shallow water as in estuaries. Tide height and current tables are of great importance to navigators, but the detailed motions are complex. The thorough analysis at which he excelled became the international standard for the study of tides and the production of tables through the method of determination of Harmonic Elements by Least-Squares Fitting to data observed at each place of interest. That is, by proper association of the astronomical phases, observations made at one time can enable predictions decades away with different astronomical phases.

WWII
Doodson used and became involved in the design of tide-predicting machines, of which a widely used example was the "Doodson-Légé TPM".

Among other works, Doodson was co-author, with H.D. Warburg of the 1941 "Admiralty Manual of Tides".

As the Allies prepared the invasion of Nazi-occupied France, they wanted to land at first light when it was low tide, so hidden obstacles could be seen. Doodson was enlisted to work out the tidal patterns using his mechanised calculators. His calculations revealed that 5–7 June would provide the best combination of full moon and ideal tidal conditions and D-Day duly took place on 6 June 1944. By 1943, the staff at Liverpool Tidal Institute for tidal analysis had been reduced to Doodson and six young women. They also did "nighttime fire watch on the roof in tin helmets and trench coats and carrying buckets of water in case an incendiary bomb hit the observatory".

Personal life and death
Doodson was part of a breakaway sect of the Plymouth Brethren and conscientious objector. He married twice. In 1919 he married Margaret, daughter of J. W. Galloway, a tramways engineer of Halifax with whom he had a daughter, who died in 1936, and he had a son, whose mother died shortly after giving birth in 1931. He married again in 1933 Elsie May, daughter of W. A. Carey, who survived him. He died at Birkenhead on 10 January 1968 and was buried at Flaybrick Hill Cemetery. He

Further biographical information is available from the National Oceanography Centre, whose Liverpool facility was formerly the Liverpool Observatory and Tidal Institute, part of the UK Natural Environment Research Council, of which Doodson became director.

Awards and achievements
In May, 1933 he was elected a Fellow of the Royal Society His nomination reads

References

External links 
 
 doodson.m Matlab/Octave function of main tidal waves Doodson's arguments and period.

1890 births
1968 deaths
British oceanographers
Fellows of the Royal Society
Alumni of the University of Liverpool
People from Salford